Guillaume de Mévius (born 4 August 1994) is a Belgian rally driver. He is currently part of Red Bull's rallying team for rally raid events and was part of the inaugural World Rally-Raid Championship. He has previously driven in the World Rally Championship-2. 

He is the son of former World Rally Championship driver Grégoire De Mévius

Career
de Mévius began competing in rally in 2013, focusing primarily on the Belgian Rally Championship. In 2017, de Mévius won the Junior class of the Belgian Rally Championship. In 2019, de Mévius was hired by Citroën to compete in World Rally Championship-2, but lasted only one year before returning to national level rally.

In 2021, de Mévius signed to drive for the Red Bull Off-Road Junior team in the T3 Light Prototype class, initially in the FIA World Cup for Cross-Country Rallies and later in the World Rally-Raid Championship after it was rebranded, and in individual events suck as the Dakar Rally. de Mévius took his first win in this championship in the 2022 Andalucía Rally. In 2023, de Mévius remained a Red Bull driver, but instead moved to GRally Team, formed by himself and his brother Ghislain. The team did not register for the World Rally-Raid Championship, instead electing to participate in individual events.

Rally results

WRC results

WRC2 results

Dakar Rally results

Complete World Rally-Raid Championship results
(key)

References

Living people
1994 births
Belgian rally drivers
World Rally Championship drivers
Citroën Racing drivers
European Rally Championship drivers
Dakar Rally drivers
Off-road racing drivers